FullBeauty Brands Operations, LLC. is an American holding company based in New York City, featuring online and catalog retail brands for plus size women’s apparel, big & tall men’s apparel, and home goods . As of November 2017, the company's CEO was Emilie Arel.

History

Fullbeauty Brands was founded in 1901 in New York, New York. In 1924, the company launched its first fashion catalog. In 1941, the mail order business moved to Indiana where the company fulfills catalog and online orders from its fulfillment centers in Indianapolis and Plainfield. In 1999, the company’s call center was opened in El Paso, Texas.

In February 2013, the company was purchased by Charlesbank Capital Partners and Webster Capital. In 2015, the company rebranded itself, it was previously known as OSP Group.

In October 2015, Fullbeauty Brands was acquired by Apax Partners.

Brands
FullBeauty Brands Operations, LLC. is an umbrella holding company with multiple brands under its label. These include: One Stop Plus, Woman Within, Roaman's, Catherine's, Jessica London, Ellos, Swimsuits For All, Brylane Home, King Size, Full Beauty Outlet, Shoes For All, and Intimates For All.

Support for the Body Positive Movement

Fullbeauty has sought to support the Body Positive Movement in promoting messaging that runs contrary to the trend of using extremely skinny fashion models.  In 2015 the company ran a campaign called "OwnYourCurves" which sought to alter consumers' perceptions of size and shape as it related to beauty through the positive portrayal of "plus size" women. Meghan Trainor partnered with the company in the campaign.

References

Clothing retailers of the United States
Mail-order retailers
Clothing companies based in New York City
American companies established in 1901
Clothing companies established in 1901
Retail companies established in 1901
Private equity portfolio companies
Companies that filed for Chapter 11 bankruptcy in 2019